Lepidochrysops ansorgei is a butterfly in the family Lycaenidae. It is found in Angola and Zambia.

Adults are on wing from October to November.

References

Butterflies described in 1959
Lepidochrysops